The Queen's Hotel was a hotel located on Marine Parade in Kirn, Argyll and Bute, Scotland. Now a private residence, it is a Category C listed building, dating to around 1859. Its first proprietor was Mrs Urquhart.

A building known as the Kirn Inn was on the site by 1837. The inn was renamed after the accession of Queen Victoria in that year, and it appears in the Valuation Roll for 1859 under its later name.

The hotel was expanded in 1904, the work carried out by Boston, Menzies and Morton.

Gallery

References

External links
KIRN, THE QUEEN'S HOTEL - Historic Environment Scotland
Dunoon, Marine Parade, The Queen's Hotel - Canmore.org.uk
A photo of the Queen's Hotel in its heyday

Buildings and structures in Kirn
Category C listed buildings in Argyll and Bute
Listed hotels in Scotland
Defunct hotels in Scotland
Hotels in Argyll and Bute
1859 establishments in Scotland